The Ross Site designated 3CL401, is a prehistoric archaeological site in Clark County, Arkansas, near the small town of Whelen Springs.  The site includes two Native American mounds from the Caddoan culture, which have been dated to AD 1400–1600.  It is one of a small number of Caddoan sites in southwestern Arkansas. The site was relatively unscathed until the mid-1980s, having never been plowed over, thus leaving intact potential ground-level features other than the mounds.

The site was listed on the National Register of Historic Places in 1985.

See also
National Register of Historic Places listings in Clark County, Arkansas

References

Archaeological sites on the National Register of Historic Places in Arkansas
Clark County, Arkansas
National Register of Historic Places in Clark County, Arkansas